Christopher Lynn Hedges (born September 18, 1956) is an American journalist, Presbyterian minister, author, and commentator.

In his early career, Hedges worked as a freelance war correspondent in Central America for The Christian Science Monitor, NPR, and Dallas Morning News. Hedges reported for The New York Times from 1990 to 2005, and served as the Times Middle East Bureau Chief and Balkan Bureau Chief during the wars in the former Yugoslavia. In 2001, Hedges contributed to The New York Times staff entry that received the 2002 Pulitzer Prize for Explanatory Reporting for the paper's coverage of global terrorism.

Hedges produced a weekly column for Truthdig for 14 years until the outlet's hiatus in 2020. His books include War Is a Force That Gives Us Meaning (2002), a finalist for the National Book Critics Circle Award for Nonfiction; American Fascists: The Christian Right and the War on America (2007); Death of the Liberal Class (2010); and Days of Destruction, Days of Revolt (2012), written with cartoonist Joe Sacco.

Hedges hosted the television program On Contact for RT America from 2016 to 2022.

Early life
Christopher Lynn Hedges was born on September 18, 1956 in St. Johnsbury, Vermont. His father was a World War II veteran, Presbyterian minister, and anti-war activist. He was raised in rural Schoharie County, New York, southwest of Albany.

Education 
Hedges received a scholarship to attend Loomis Chaffee School, a private boarding school in Windsor, Connecticut. Hedges founded an underground newspaper at the school that was banned by the administration and resulted in his being put on probation. He participated in track and graduated in 1975.

Hedges enrolled into Colgate University and, though heterosexual, helped found an LGBT student group. Hedges received his Bachelor of Arts degree in English from Colgate in 1979. He sought a postgraduate education at Harvard University's Divinity School where he studied under James Luther Adams in addition to studying classics and Classical Greek. While attending Harvard, Hedges lived in Roxbury, a blighted inner city neighborhood in Boston, where he worked as a seminarian and ran a small church. He was also a member of the Greater Boston YMCA's boxing team, writing that the boxing gym was "the only place I felt safe."

Early career 
Hedges gained an interest in pursuing journalism as a means of furthering ministry after a period of close communications with British journalist Robert Cox, who was at that time reporting on the Dirty War in Argentina. While having one year left before graduation, Hedges briefly dropped out of Harvard to study Spanish in Cochabamba, Bolivia with the support of the Catholic Maryknoll Fathers. Following Cox's recommendation, Hedges informally prepared for work as a reporter through studying a four-volume set of collected works by George Orwell. Hedges made some freelance contributions for The Washington Post, and later covered the Falklands War from Buenos Aires for National Public Radio using equipment given to him by NPR reporter William Buzenberg. Hedges returned to the United States to complete a Master of Divinity degree at Harvard in 1983.

Hedges continued his career as a freelance journalist in Latin America. From 1983 to 1984, he covered the conflicts in El Salvador, Nicaragua and Guatemala for The Christian Science Monitor and NPR. He was hired as the Central America Bureau Chief for The Dallas Morning News in 1984 and held this position until 1988. Noam Chomsky wrote of Hedges at the time that he was one of the "few US journalists in Central America who merit the title."

Hedges took a sabbatical to study Arabic in 1988. He was appointed the Middle East Bureau Chief for The Dallas Morning News in 1989. In one of his first stories for the paper he tracked down Robert Manning in the settlement of Kiryat Arba in the Israeli-occupied West Bank. Manning, linked to the militant Jewish Defense League and allegedly behind several murders including the 1985 bombing death in California of Alex Odeh, was extradited to the United States in 1991 where he is serving a life sentence for a separate bombing incident.

The New York Times
In 1990, Hedges was hired by The New York Times. He covered the first Gulf War for the paper, where he refused to participate in the military pool system that restricted the movement and reporting of journalists. He was arrested by the United States Army and had his press credentials revoked, but continued to defy the military restrictions to report outside the pool system. Hedges subsequently entered Kuwait with U.S. Marine Corps members who were distrustful of the Army's press control. Within The New York Times, R.W. Apple Jr. supported Hedges' defiance of the pool system.

Hedges, along with Neal Conan, was taken prisoner in Basra after the war by the Iraqi Republican Guard during the Shiite uprising. He was freed after a week. Hedges was appointed the paper’s Middle East Bureau Chief in 1991. His reporting on the atrocities committed by Saddam Hussein in the Kurdish-held parts of northern Iraq saw the Iraqi leader offer a bounty for anyone who killed Hedges, along with other western journalists and aid workers in the region. Several aid workers and journalists, including the German reporter Lissy Schmidt, were assassinated and others were severely wounded.

Yugoslav Wars (1995–2000) 
In 1995, Hedges was named the Balkan Bureau Chief for The New York Times. He was based in Sarajevo when the city was being hit by over 300 shells a day by the surrounding Bosnia Serbs. He reported on the Srebrenica massacre in July 1995 and shortly after the war uncovered what appeared to be one of the central collection points and hiding places for perhaps thousands of corpses at the large open pit Ljubija mine during the Bosnian Serbs' ethnic cleansing campaign. He and the photographer Wade Goddard were the first reporters to travel with armed units of the Kosovo Liberation Army (KLA) in Kosovo. Hedges investigative piece was published in The New York Times in June 1999 detailing how Hashim Thaçi, leader of the Kosovo Liberation Army (and later president of Kosovo), directed a campaign in which as many as half a dozen top rebel commanders were assassinated and many others were brutally purged to consolidate his power. Thaci, indicted by the special court in The Hague on 10 counts of war crimes, is in detention in The Hague awaiting trial.

Hedges was a Nieman Fellow at Harvard University during the 1998–1999 academic year, and chose to study Latin because of his prior interest in the classics from studying Classical Greek.

Hedges ended his career of reporting in active conflicts in October 2000.

Terrorism coverage and Iraq War (2001–2005) 
Hedges was based in Paris following the attacks of 9/11, covering Al Qaeda in Europe and the Middle East. He was a member of a New York Times investigative team that won the Pulitzer Prize for Breaking News Reporting in 2002 for their coverage of Al Qaeda. Hedges also received the Amnesty International Global Award for Human Rights Journalism in 2002. Hedges' contribution to the Times award was an October 2001 article describing Al Qaeda's foiled bombing plot of the Embassy of the United States, Paris.

Reporting from coached defectors 

In a collaboration between The New York Times and Frontline, Hedges authored three articles covering the claims of false Iraqi defectors. Hedges worked on the behalf of Lowell Bergman of Frontline, who could not travel to Beirut to interview the purported defectors. The trip was organized by Ahmed Chalabi, who Hedges considered to be unreliable. The first defector Hedges interviewed identified themselves as Lt. General Jamal al-Ghurairy. Hedges consulted the U.S. Embassy in Turkey to confirm their identity, and the embassy falsely did so as the real al-Ghurairy had never left Iraq.

Hedges wrote a November 8, 2001 Times cover story about two former Iraqi military commanders who claimed to have trained foreign mujahedeen how to hijack planes and destroy vital American infrastructure. The two defectors also asserted there was a secret compound in Salman Pak facility where a German scientist was producing biological weapons. The Frontline report featured statements from American officials who doubted the claims of the defectors.

Conservative outlets referenced the articles in justifying the invasion of Iraq. In the aftermath of the revelations that the Iraqi defectors were not legitimate, Hedges defended his comportment since he had done the story as a favor to Lowell Bergman, adding that "There has to be a level of trust between reporters. We cover each other's sources when it's a good story because otherwise everyone would get hold of it."

Exit from the Times 
In 2003, Hedges gave a commencement speech at the graduation ceremony for Rockford College in which he criticized the ongoing American invasion of Iraq. His speech was received with boos, and his microphone was shut off three minutes after he began speaking. Hedges had to end the commencement speech short because of the various student disruptions, which included an additional microphone cut, foghorns, and chants of "God Bless America."

The New York Times criticized Hedges' statements and issued him a formal reprimand for "public remarks that could undermine public trust in the paper's impartiality". Hedges cited this reprimand as a motivation for resigning from the Times in 2005.

During the uncertainty following the loss of employment, Hedges was looking for posts to teach high school English classes. In a 2008 interview, Hedges acknowledged that he ultimately had not struggled, adding that "every year since I left the Times, I’ve made at least twice the salary I made at the paper. So, in a way, I didn’t pay for it. And I have maintained what is most valuable to me, which is my integrity and my voice."

Later career

In 2005, Hedges became a senior fellow at Type Media Center, and a columnist at Truthdig, in addition to writing books and teaching inmates at a New Jersey correctional institution.

In 2006, Hedges was awarded a Lannan Literary Fellowship for Nonfiction.

Truthdig (2006–2020) 
Hedges produced a weekly column in Truthdig for 14 years. He was fired along with all of the editorial staff in March 2020. Hedges and the staff had gone on strike earlier in the month to protest the publisher's attempt to fire the Editor-in-Chief Robert Scheer, demand an end to a series of unfair labor practices and the right to form a union. Hedges resumed work with Scheer after the launch of Scheerpost.

In June 2014, Christopher Ketcham published an article on The New Republic website accusing Hedges of improper citations in several Truthdig columns, alleging the offenses constituted plagiarism. In response, some formatting and reference errors were corrected on the implicated Truthdig posts. Additional accusations of plagiarism from Ketcham were countered by an independent investigation from the Type Media Center. The Washington Free Beacon reported that a spokesperson for The New York Times said it "did not have reason to believe Hedges plagiarized in his work for the paper" and had no plans to investigate Hedges for plagiarism.

Prison writing teacher 
Hedges has worked for a decade teaching writing classes in prisons in New Jersey through a program offered by Princeton University and later Rutgers University. A class that Hedges taught at East Jersey State Prison in 2013 went on to collaborate in the creation of a play titled Caged.  Hedges has become a fierce critic of mass incarceration in the United States, and his experience as an educator in New Jersey prisons served as inspiration for his 2021 book Our Class: Trauma and Transformation in an American Prison.

Ordination and ministerial installation
On October 5, 2014, Hedges was ordained a minister within the Presbyterian Church. He was installed as Associate Pastor and Minister of Social Witness and Prison Ministry at the Second Presbyterian Church Elizabeth in Elizabeth, New Jersey. He mentioned being rejected for ordination 30 years earlier, saying that "going to El Salvador as a reporter was not something the Presbyterian Church at the time recognized as a valid ministry, and a committee rejected my 'call.'"

On Contact (2016–2022) 
Hedges began hosting the television show On Contact for the Russian-government owned network RT America in June 2016. Hedges, initially unfamiliar with the network, was approached to make a show by RT America president Mikhail "Misha" Solodovnikov, who personally guaranteed Hedges' editorial independence.

On Contact provided commentary on social issues, often profiling nonfiction authors and their recently published works with Hedges aiming to follow the approach of former public television shows. On Contact was nominated for an Emmy in 2017, RT America's first significant award nomination, but the award was won by Steve.

On March 3, 2022, RT America ceased operations following the widespread deplatforming of Russian-sponsored media caused by the 2022 Russian invasion of Ukraine. The run of On Contact ended. In a March 7, 2022 Scheerpost column (reprinted by Salon), Hedges contrasted the reprimand he received from The New York Times for his Iraq War opposition to RT America, who made no comment on Hedges' condemnation of the Russian invasion of Ukraine. Hedges said he "might have paid with" his job for making negative comments about the war in Ukraine, "but at least for those six days", after the invasion, he remained in post.

Hedges, in collaboration with The Real News Network, began production in April 2022 for a web series called The Chris Hedges Report.

Political views

Hedges has described himself as a socialist and an anarchist. His books Death of the Liberal Class and Empire of Illusion are strongly critical of American liberalism.

Hedges' 2007 book American Fascists describes the fundamentalist Christian right in the United States as a fascist movement. In March 2008, Hedges published the book I Don't Believe in Atheists, in which he argues that new atheism presents a danger that is similar to religious extremism.

Environmental views 

On September 20, 2014, a day before the People's Climate March, Hedges joined Bernie Sanders, Naomi Klein, Bill McKibben, and Kshama Sawant on a panel moderated by WNYC's Brian Lehrer to discuss the issue of climate change. 

Hedges has argued that the impact of population growth must be addressed, saying "all measures to thwart the degradation and destruction of our ecosystem will be useless if we do not cut population growth."

Occupy involvement 
Hedges appeared as a guest on an October 2011 episode of the CBC News Network's Lang and O'Leary Exchange to discuss his support for the Occupy Wall Street protests; co-host Kevin O'Leary criticized him, saying that he sounded "like a left-wing nutbar". Hedges said "it will be the last time" he appears on the show, and compared the CBC to Fox News. CBC's ombudsman found O'Leary's heated remarks to be a violation of the public broadcaster's journalistic standards.

On November 3, 2011, Hedges was arrested with others in New York City as part of the Occupy Wall Street demonstration, during which the activists staged a "people's hearing" on the activities of the investment bank Goldman Sachs and blocked the entrance to their corporate headquarters.

NDAA lawsuit 

In 2012, after the Obama administration signed the National Defense Authorization Act (NDAA), Hedges sued members of the US government, asserting that Section 1021 of the law unconstitutionally allowed presidential authority for indefinite detention without habeas corpus. He was later joined in the suit, Hedges v. Obama, by activists including Noam Chomsky and Daniel Ellsberg. In May 2012 Judge Katherine B. Forrest of the Southern District of New York ruled that the counter-terrorism provision of the NDAA is unconstitutional. The Obama administration appealed the decision and it was overturned in July 2013 by the Second Circuit Court of Appeals. Hedges petitioned the U.S. Supreme Court to hear the case, but the Supreme Court denied certiorari in April 2014.

Hedges was previously a plaintiff in Clapper v. Amnesty International.

Campaigns 
In the 2008 United States presidential campaign, Hedges was a speech writer for candidate Ralph Nader. Hedges supported Green Party candidate Jill Stein in the 2016 election.

On April 15, 2016, Hedges was arrested, along with 100 other protesters, during a sit-in outside the Capitol building in Washington D.C. during Democracy Spring to protest corporate political influence.

On May 27, 2020, Hedges announced that he would run as a Green Party candidate in New Jersey's 12th congressional district for the 2020 elections.  After being informed the following day that running for office would conflict with FCC fairness doctrine rules because he was at that time hosting the nationally broadcast RT America television show On Contact, Hedges decided not to pursue office in order to keep hosting the show.

In September 2020, Hedges spoke at the Movement for a People's Party convention.

Later writings

Views on the 2022 Russian invasion of Ukraine 

In a March 2022 piece for the Salon website, Hedges wrote that the Russian invasion of Ukraine was "a criminal war of aggression", but argued the likelihood of conflict was aggravated by NATO's expansion after the collapse of the Soviet Union. Hedges called NATO's actions a "dangerous and sadly predictable provocation" that baited Russia to initiate a conflict. Hedges called for an immediate ceasefire and "a moratorium on arms shipments to Ukraine and the withdrawal of Russian troops from the country." He further added that the invasion was "stoked in part by NATO expansion beyond the borders of a unified Germany violating promises made to Moscow at the end of the Cold War, now looks set to become a lengthy war of attrition, one funded and backed by an increasingly bellicose United States." Hedges was critical of the $40 billion aid package for Ukraine in a May 2022 piece in Salon, which he says demonstrates that the United States is "trapped in the death spiral of unchecked militarism" as the country "rots, morally, politically, economically, and physically" with no real plans to address the epidemic of mass shootings, decaying infrastructure, lack of universal healthcare, ever rising inequality, student debt, child poverty and the opioid epidemic.

In his 2022 book The Greatest Evil is War, Hedges writes:

Preemptive war, whether in Iraq or Ukraine, is a war crime. It does not matter if the war is launched on the basis of lies and fabrications, as was the case in Iraq, or because of the breaking of a series of agreements with Russia, including the promise by Washington not to extend NATO beyond the borders of a unified Germany, not to deploy thousands of NATO troops in Central and Eastern Europe, and not to meddle in the internal affairs of nations on Russia's border, as well as the refusal to implement the Minsk peace agreement. The invasion of Ukraine would, I expect, never have happened if these promises had been kept. Russia has every right to feel threatened, betrayed, and angry. But to understand is not to condone. The invasion of Ukraine, under post-Nuremberg laws, is a criminal war of aggression.

Personal life
Hedges is married to the Canadian actress Eunice Wong. The couple have two children. He also has two children from a previous marriage. Hedges currently lives in Princeton, New Jersey.

Hedges has post-traumatic stress disorder from his experience reporting in war zones, and was once suicidal as a result of trauma.

In November 2014, Hedges announced that he and his family had become vegan. He compared his decision to a vow of abstinence, adding that it is necessary "to make radical changes to save ourselves from ecological meltdown." Hedges authored an introduction to a vegan cookbook in 2015, The Anarchist Cookbook, written by Keith McHenry and Chaz Bufe. His wife, Eunice Wong, is a vegan activist and writer.

Hedges speaks Levantine Arabic, French, and Spanish in addition to his native English.

Books
 2002: War Is a Force That Gives Us Meaning
 2003: What Every Person Should Know About War
 2005: Losing Moses on the Freeway: The 10 Commandments in America
 2007: American Fascists: The Christian Right and the War on America
 2008: I Don't Believe in Atheists
 2008: Collateral Damage: America's War Against Iraqi Civilians, with Laila Al-Arian
 2009: When Atheism Becomes Religion: America's New Fundamentalists,, a retitled edition of I Don't Believe in Atheists
 2009: Empire of Illusion: The End of Literacy and the Triumph of Spectacle
 2010: Death of the Liberal Class
 2010: The World As It Is: Dispatches on the Myth of Human Progress
 2012: Days of Destruction, Days of Revolt, with Joe Sacco
 2015: Wages of Rebellion: The Moral Imperative of Revolt
 2016: Unspeakable
 2018: America: The Farewell Tour
 2021 Our Class: Trauma and Transformation in an American Prison
 2022 The Greatest Evil is War

See also

 Christian left
 Sacrifice zone

References

External links 

 APB Speakers Bureau Chris Hedges
 
 
 "Capitalism's 'Sacrifice Zones Bill Moyers talks with Chris Hedges, and comic-journalist Joe Sacco talking about their collaboration and showing drawings for their book Days of Destruction, Days of Revolt, July 20, 2012. Retrieved July 30, 2012
 Columns by Chris Hedges at Truthdig
 What Every Person Should Know About War, first chapter at The New York Times
 Chris Hedges at Scheerpost.
 The Chris Hedges Report at The Real News Network.

1956 births
Living people
21st-century American male writers
21st-century American non-fiction writers
American anti-capitalists
American anti-fascists
Anti-imperialism
American Christian socialists
American foreign policy writers
American male non-fiction writers
American political writers
American Presbyterians
American reporters and correspondents
American socialists
American war correspondents
Anti-consumerists
Anti-corporate activists
The Christian Science Monitor people
Colgate University alumni
Columbia University faculty
Critics of atheism
The Dallas Morning News people
Harvard Divinity School alumni
Loomis Chaffee School alumni
The Nation (U.S. magazine) people
The New York Times writers
Nieman Fellows
PEN Oakland/Josephine Miles Literary Award winners
People from Schoharie, New York
People from St. Johnsbury, Vermont
Presbyterian socialists
RT (TV network) people
War correspondents of the Iraq War
War correspondents of the Yugoslav Wars
Writers about religion and science
American anarchists